The Cloth Peddler is a 1945 Azerbaijani romantic comedy musical film  made in Baku, based on the operetta Arshin Mal Alan by the famous Azerbaijani composer Uzeyir Hajibeyov.

Plot
Set in Baku at the turn of the 20th century, a young successful businessman Asgar (Rashid Behbudov) wishes to marry. He wants his bride to be the choice of his heart, but Azerbaijani tradition restricted him from communicating with the lady as a lover before marriage. So he decides to disguise himself as a mere cloth peddler and the young woman, Gulchoehra (Leyla Badirbayli,) falls in love with him. However, she is concerned that her father, Soltan bey (Alakbar Huseynzade) will not allow her to marry a cloth peddler. Young Asgar then reveals himself to her father and asks for her hand in marriage. Seeing that he is indeed a wealthy young man, the father agrees and the two are permitted to marry.

Cast
Rashid Behbudov - Asgar
Leyla Badirbayli - Guelchohra
Alakbar Huseynzade - Soltan bey
Munavvar Kalantarli - Jahan khala
Ismayil Afandiyev - Suleyman
Rahila Mustafayeva - Asya
Lutfali Abdullayev - Vali
Mirzaagha Aliyev

About movie

The film has been shown in 136 countries and translated into 86 languages.

The film was re-mastered and colorized in 2013 in Los Angeles at the expense of the Heydar Aliyev Foundation of Azerbaijan.
The 1945 film was shot in black-and-white in the midst of Soviet engagement in World War II
The Ministry of Culture and Tourism brought a copy of the film "Arshin Mal Alan" in the Moscow Film Foundation to Baku with the financial support of the International Bank, and organized a re-translation of it into Azerbaijani. The film was shown for the first time at its 60th anniversary on 16 May 2006.
The film was screened at the Le Balzac Cinema in France in March 2018 within the framework of the Week of Foreign Films.

Colorization

On the initiative of the Heydar Aliyev Foundation, the film was colorized and remastered in Los Angeles in 2012-2013. Its colorized version was premiered in Baku in December 2013.

The colorized version of Arshin Mal Alan (The Cloth Peddler), was shown on 19 September 2015 in Hollywood by the Consulate General of Azerbaijan in Los Angeles

See also
List of Azerbaijani films
Arshin Mal Alan (operetta)
If Not That One, Then This One

References

External links

Soviet romantic comedy films
Azerbaijani comedy films
Azerbaijani-language films
Films directed by Rza Tahmasib
1945 musical comedy films
1945 films
Films based on operettas